Population: 1975 is the second album by the queercore band the Butchies, released in 1999.

Critical reception
The Chicago Tribune called the songs "sonic tapestries woven from nimble bass, alternately lithe/dense guitar and intricate drums."

Track listing
"Insult to Injury"
"It's Over"
"More Rock More Talk"
"Movies Movies"
"Population 1975
"Eleanor
"Ms Doolittle
"Love in the Hour"
"Intro"
"Baby DNA"
"Gertrude + Stein"

References

1999 albums
The Butchies albums